Milwaukee Excel High School (MEHS) is an alternative academic charter school in the Milwaukee Public Schools district in Milwaukee, Wisconsin.

External links
Milwaukee Excel High School website 

Charter schools in Wisconsin